Mingling Spirits is a 1916 silent film comedy short directed by Al Christie and starring his regular stable of actors Eddie Lyons, Betty Compson and Lee Moran. It was produced by the Nestor Film Company and distributed through Universal Film Manufacturing Company.

Cast
Eddie Lyons - Mr. Newlywed
Betty Compson - Mrs. Newlywed
Lee Moran - Jim Smith
Stella Adams - Mrs. Newlywed's Mother

See also
Betty Compson filmography

References

External links
Mingling Spirits at IMDb.com

1916 films
Films directed by Al Christie
American silent short films
American black-and-white films
Universal Pictures short films
Silent American comedy films
1916 comedy films
1910s American films